The Team equestrian event at the 2004 Summer Paralympics was competed on 26 September. It was won by the team representing .

Final round

26 Sept. 2004, 09:00

Team Lists

References

2004 Summer Paralympics events